"Crazy" is a song by British R&B girl group Eternal. Written and produced by BeBe Winans, the song was released in December 1994 as the sixth and final single to be released from their debut album, Always & Forever (1993). It entered and peaked at number 15 on the UK Singles Chart, staying on the charts for seven weeks. This would be the last single to feature member Louise Redknapp, who left the group to pursue a solo career. Due to other commitments, Eternal were unable to record a promotional video for the song.

Critical reception
A reviewer from Music Week gave the song five out of five, stating that "the girl's gospel roots are to the fore on this bumper Christmas package which once aga[i]n puts them in Whitney Houston, as opposed to En Vogue, territory." Ralph Tee from the RM Dance Update deemed it one of the "highlights" from the album. Another editor, James Hamilton, described it as a "strongly wailed Whitney-ish gospel remake".

Track listings
 UK CD1 and cassette single
 "Crazy"
 "(Something Inside) So Strong"
 "Amazing Grace"
 "His Eye Is on the Sparrow"

 UK CD2
 "Crazy" (West End remix)
 "Crazy" (The Association remix)
 "Crazy" (Johnny Douglas remix)
 "Crazy" (T&K remix)

Credits and personnel
Credits are lifted from the Always & Forever album booklet.

Studios
 Recorded in Nashville and Los Angeles
 Mixed at RG Jones Studios (London, England)

Personnel
 BeBe Winans – writing, production
 Tim Simenon – mixing

Charts

References

1993 songs
1994 singles
EMI Records singles
Eternal (band) songs
First Avenue Records singles
Songs written by BeBe Winans